Wooden Shjips (pronounced "ships") is an American experimental and psychedelic rock band from San Francisco, California.

History 
The project has released one EP and seven albums. Guitarist Ripley Johnson also plays in two side projects, including Moon Duo, formed in 2009 with Sanae Yamada. The group played at the 2010 All Tomorrow's Parties music festival in Monticello, New York in September 2010 at the request of film director Jim Jarmusch. Johnson has also released solo music under the name Rose City Band. They are signed to Thrill Jockey records.

Musical style 
Their sound has been described as experimental, minimalist, drone rock, and "spacey psychedelic rock". They have been compared to Suicide, Spacemen 3, 
Loop, The Velvet Underground, The Doors, Soft Machine, Guru Guru, The Black Angels and many more.

Discography

Studio albums 
 Wooden Shjips (2007)
 Dos (2009) 
 West (2011)
 Back to Land (2013)
 V. (2018)

Compilation albums 
 Vol. 1 (2008)
 Vol. 2  (2010)

Singles and EPs 
Self-released
 Shrinking Moon For You (2006) 
 Holiday Cassingle cs (2008)
via Sick Thirst
 Dance, California (2006) 
 SOL '07 (2007) 
 European Tour (split with The Heads) [2008]
 Vampire Blues (2008)
 Oh Tennenbaum / Auld Lang Syne (2010) 
 Tour of Australia and New Zealand (2010)
via Mexican Summer
 Contact (2009)
via The Great Pop Supplement
 Big City (Demo) / I Believe It (split with Spacemen 3) [2009]
via Sub Pop
 Loose Lips / Start To Dreaming (2007)

References

External links

 Official website
 
 Discogs 
 BBC Artist page, including reviews and tracks played 

Acid rock music groups
American experimental musical groups
Musical groups from San Francisco
Psychedelic rock music groups from California
American space rock musical groups
Thrill Jockey artists